Prešeren laureates are Slovene scientists and artists who have been awarded the Prešeren Award for their achievements. The Prešeren Award is the highest decoration in the field of artistic and in the past also scientific creation in Slovenia. It is awarded annually by the Prešeren Fund. It has been bestowed since 1947.



1947

2000

2001

2002

2003

2004

2005

2006

2007

2008

2009

2010

2011

2012

2013

2014

2015

2016

References

External links
Prešernove nagrade. List of Prešeren laureates. Ministry of Culture of the Republic of Slovenia. 
 

 
Lists of Slovenian people
Prešeren Award laureates